Wolfstein may refer to

Places:
 Wolfstein, Rhineland-Palatinate, a municipality in Rhineland-Palatinate, Germany
 Wolfstein (Verbandsgemeinde), in Rhineland-Palatinate, Germany
 Wolfstein (principality), a minor principality in the Holy Roman Empire
 Wolfstein Castle former castle in Freyung, Lower Bavaria
 New Wolfstein Castle, a ruined castle above the town of Wolfstein, Rhineland-Palatinate

People:
 Rosi Wolfstein (1888-1987), German politician
 A character in the 1968 horror film The Mark of the Wolfman

Other:
Wolfstein (book), an 1822 chapbook based on Percy Bysshe Shelley's 1811 Gothic horror novel St. Irvyne
Wolfstein, an album by Chilly Gonzales

See also 
Wolfenstein (disambiguation)